The 1867 Town of New Plymouth by-election was a by-election held  on 29 April 1867 in the  electorate during the 4th New Zealand Parliament.

The by-election was caused by the resignation of the incumbent, John Richardson on 16 March 1867.

He was replaced by Harry Atkinson.

Atkinson was the only nomination, so was declared elected unopposed.

References 

 

New Plymouth 1867
1867 elections in New Zealand
April 1867 events
Politics of Taranaki